People from Ibiza may refer to:
People from Ibiza (song)
Ibiza#People